Gilbert Banester (also Banaster, Banastir, Banastre;  1445 – 1487) was an English composer and poet of Flemish influences.

Possibly a native of London, he was Master of the Children of the Chapel Royal from 1478 to 1490. His works are found in a number of Tudor manuscript collections of church music, including the Pepys Manuscript; there is also an antiphon by his hand in the Eton Choirbook. Stylistically the work is similar to those of William Horwood in the same book, but is unusual in that it is written to a prose text. Two poems have been ascribed to Banester, the Miracle of St Thomas of 1467 and a translation of Boccaccio, dating to 1450, that is the first known in the English language.

Little else is known of Banester's life. He was recorded as the "king's servant" in 1471. In addition, it is known that Edward IV provided him with corrodies for two Abbeys, and he was made a Gentleman of the Chapel Royal in 1475. In 1478, he became master of the choristers. He died in 1487.

References

1440s births
1487 deaths
English classical composers
Renaissance composers
Gentlemen of the Chapel Royal
Musicians from London
15th-century English people
Composers of the Tudor period
English male classical composers
Masters of the Children of the Chapel Royal